Shamaldy-Say is an urban-type settlement in Jalal-Abad Region, Kyrgyzstan. The town is administratively subordinated to town Tash-Kömür. Its population was 12,308 in 2021. Adjacent to the urban-type settlement Shamaldy-Say is the village Shamaldy-Say, population 6,526 (2021), which is part of Nooken District.

Population

References

Populated places in Jalal-Abad Region